Luis Marín Sabater (4 September 1906 – 21 December 1974) was a Spanish-Basque football player of the 1930s and 1940s.

A native of the Basque town of Ordizia (since the 1979 Statute of Gernika, a part of autonomous Basque Country), he was a striker for Real Madrid CF between 1936 and 1941. Before joining Real Madrid, he was a player for Atlético Madrid, and he later played for Granada CF.

He was a member of the Spain squad at the 1934 FIFA World Cup, but did not play, and never made his international debut.

His son, Luis Marín Garcia, was also a footballer, who played as a midfielder for Rayo Vallecano and Celta Vigo in the 1950s.

References

External links
 
 

Spanish footballers
Footballers from the Basque Country (autonomous community)
Real Madrid CF players
Atlético Madrid footballers
Granada CF footballers
La Liga players
1906 births
1974 deaths
1934 FIFA World Cup players
Association football forwards
Basque Country international footballers